is a private junior college in Suginami, Tokyo, Japan. It was established in 1950.

See also
 List of junior colleges in Japan

External links
  

Japanese junior colleges
Universities and colleges in Tokyo